Sacred ashes are put to use in various religions.

Background
In Christianity, on Ash Wednesday, ashes of burnt palm leaves and fronds left over from Palm Sunday, mixed with olive oil, are applied in a cross-form on the forehead of the believer as a reminder of his inevitable physical death, with the intonation: "Dust thou art, and to dust will return" from Genesis 3:19 in the Old Testament.

In Hinduism, sacred ashes or Vibhuti are used to smear, anoint or mark devotees.

See also
 Vibhuti

References

Religious symbols